Hubert Arbès (born 9 January 1950) is a French former racing cyclist. His sporting career began with CC Bearn.  He rode in five editions of the Tour de France between 1976 and 1982 and in the 1980 Giro d'Italia.

Major results
1974
 1st  Overall Tour du Loir-et-Cher
 2nd Paris–Troyes
 3rd Paris–Rouen
 4th Overall Tour de Bretagne
1977
 1st Stage 5 Étoile des Espoirs
1978
 3rd Overall Tour du Limousin
1st Stage 3
1980
 3rd GP Monaco

References

External links
 

1950 births
Living people
French male cyclists
Sportspeople from Pyrénées-Atlantiques
Cyclists from Nouvelle-Aquitaine
20th-century French people